The South African Railways Class  of 1980 is a diesel-electric locomotive.

Beginning in August 1980, the South African Railways placed 101 Class  General Motors Electro-Motive Division type SW1002 diesel-electric locomotives in service. In 1984, one Class  locomotive was also built for the Bophuthatswana National Development Corporation for use at the Ga-Rankuwa Industrial Estate. Three more were placed in service by Iscor in Pretoria between 1986 and 1991, and another two by the Ithala Development Finance Corporation in KwaZulu-Natal in 1987.

Manufacturers
The Class  type SW1002 diesel-electric locomotive was designed for the South African Railways (SAR) by General Motors Electro-Motive Division (GM-EMD) and all but one were built by General Motors South Africa (GMSA) in Port Elizabeth.

The 101 locomotives for the SAR were built in two batches on two orders. It is unclear why such an odd number of locomotives were ordered.

Apart from the SAR locomotives, several were also built for industry.
 A single locomotive was built for the Bophuthatswana National Development Corporation (BNDC) in Ga-Rankuwa and delivered in 1984.
 Two locomotives, which had been ordered by the Ithala Development Finance Corporation (IDFC) in KwaZulu-Natal, were delivered in 1987 and numbered 1 and 2.
 The Argentinian-built locomotive was delivered to Iscor by GM-Astarsa in 1991 and numbered .

Class 36 series
The Class 36 locomotive group consists of two series, the General Electric (GE) Class  and the GM-EMD Class . Both manufacturers also produced locomotives for the South African Classes 33, 34 and 35.

Service

South African Railways
Class  locomotives are general purpose locomotives, equipped with two-station controls for bi-directional operation, which are used mainly for yard shunting and pickup work to service industrial customers. When placed in service, the SAR locomotives were initially distributed for service between the Western and Eastern Cape and the Eastern Transvaal Lowveld, but the Cape locomotives were later relocated to Natal, Gauteng, the North West Province and Limpopo.

On the Natal South Coast they were at one time employed in road work between Durban and Port Shepstone, working in pairs or in trios.

Industry
The three Iscor locomotives were later hired out to African Rail & Traction Services (ARTS), based in a workshop at the Iscor Pretoria works, and renumbered in the range from 21 to 23. ARTS has a fleet of about twenty locomotives which are used on hire contracts. By early 2002, ARTS locomotives were employed at the Rustenburg Platinum Mine in the North West Province, at Iscor in Pretoria where it took over the entire railway operation, and at the Richards Bay Coal Terminal in KwaZulu-Natal.

The BNDC locomotive did not remain in service in Bophuthatwana very long before it went to Columbus Stainless in Middelburg, Transvaal.

The IDFC locomotives were later sold to Sheltam, where they were numbered 24 and 25 and later renumbered to 1003 and 1004.

Works numbers
Apart from on their works plates, the builder’s works number was also stamped on their frames, but instead of the builder’s serial they used the last three digits of the unit’s number. No. 36-209 was therefore stamped 115-209 instead of 115-9. Units so noted were numbers 234, 235, 240, 241 and 245-115 and numbers 251, 257 and 270-118.

The Class  builder’s works numbers, dates or years built and the distribution of the non-SAR industrial locomotives are listed in the table. The dates, as shown, were recorded off the respective locomotive works plates.

Liveries
All the Class 36-200 locomotives were delivered in the SAR Gulf Red livery with signal red buffer beams, yellow side stripes on the long hood sides and a yellow V on each end. In the 1990s many of them began to be repainted in the Spoornet orange livery with a yellow and blue chevron pattern on the buffer beams. Several later received the Spoornet maroon livery. In the 2000s at least one was repainted in the Spoornet blue livery with outline numbers on the sides. After 2008 in the Transnet Freight Rail (TFR) era, some began to appear in the TFR red, green and yellow livery.

Illustration

References

3480
Bo-Bo locomotives
Electro-Motive Division locomotives
GMSA locomotives
Cape gauge railway locomotives
Railway locomotives introduced in 1980
1980 in South Africa